Cape Flannery is a cape which forms the west end of Thule Island in the South Sandwich Islands. It was charted in 1930 by Discovery Investigations personnel  on the RSS Discovery II, who named it for Sir Fortescue Flannery, a member of the Discovery Committee.

References

Headlands of South Georgia and the South Sandwich Islands